Samisoni Langi (born 11 June 1993) is a professional rugby league footballer who plays as a  and for Wakefield Trinity in the Betfred Super League. 

Langi previously played for the Sydney Roosters in the NRL, and for the Leigh Centurions and the Catalans Dragonsin the Super League, signing from the Penrith Panthers in June 2017. He has played for both Tonga and France at international level. He played as a  earlier in his career.

Early life
Langi was born in Auburn, New South Wales, Australia and is of Tongan descent. 

He played his junior rugby league for the Berala Bears. While attending Trinity Catholic College, Auburn, he was selected to play for the NSW Combined Catholic Colleges Schoolboys and the Australian Schoolboys teams, both in 2011.

Playing career
Langi played for Canterbury-Bankstown Bulldogs in the National Youth Competition before being signed by the Sydney Roosters. On 20 April 2013, Langi made his international debut for Tonga in their Pacific International against Samoa, scoring two tries and kicking four goals in a man-of-the-match performance. In 2016, Langi joined the South Sydney Rabbitohs' feeder team, the North Sydney Bears, in the New South Wales Cup. Langi joined the Penrith Panthers in 2017, playing for their New South Wales Cup team. In June 2017 he moved to Leigh on a deal lasting until the end of the season. 
In November 2017, Langi signed with the Catalans Dragons on a two-year deal.
Langi played in the 2018 Challenge Cup Final victory over the Warrington Wolves at Wembley Stadium.
On 9 October 2021, Langi played for Catalans Dragons in their 2021 Super League Grand Final defeat against St. Helens.

International career
Langi was a member of Tonga's squad for the 2013 World Cup. He played in all three of Tonga's matches, kicking a total of 7 goals. On 2 May 2015, he played for Tonga in the 2015 Polynesian Cup against Samoa. He missed Tonga's first two conversion attempts, and the goal-kicking duties were given to Solomone Kata for the remainder of the match.

On 7 May 2016, Langi played for Tonga against Samoa in the 2016 Polynesian Cup, suffering a game ending injury inside the opening 10 minutes.
Langi was named as 18th man for Tonga's 2017 Pacific Test against Fiji.
In 2022, Langi switched his allegiance from Tonga where he represented them on 7 occasions , to play for France at this years Rugby league World Cup, qualifying through residency. Langi made his debut for France in the opening round of the 2021 Rugby League World Cup against Greece.

References

External links

Catalans Dragons profile
Penrith Panthers profile
SL profile
2017 RLWC profile
France profile

1993 births
Living people
Australian sportspeople of Tongan descent
Australian rugby league players
Catalans Dragons players
France national rugby league team players
Leigh Leopards players
Newtown Jets NSW Cup players
North Sydney Bears NSW Cup players
Rugby league five-eighths
Rugby league players from New South Wales
Sydney Roosters players
Tonga national rugby league team players
Tongan sportspeople
Wakefield Trinity players
Wyong Roos players